The 1968–69 Hellenic Football League season was the 16th in the history of the Hellenic Football League, a football competition in England.

Premier Division

The Premier Division featured 14 clubs which competed in the division last season, along with three new clubs:
Aston Clinton, promoted from Division One
Chippenham Town, joined from the Wiltshire League
Henley Town, promoted from Division One

League table

Division One

The Division One featured 14 clubs which competed in the division last season, along with 4 new clubs:
Marston United, relegated from the Premier Division
Princes Risborough Town, relegated from the Premier Division
Ernest Turner Sports
Oxford City reserves

League table

References

External links
 Hellenic Football League

1968-69
H